Lah Meleh-ye Sofla-ye Jowkar (also Romanized as Lah Meleh-ye Soflá-ye Jowkār) is a village in Margown Rural District, Margown District, Boyer-Ahmad County, Kohgiluyeh and Boyer-Ahmad Province, Iran. At the 2006 census, its population was 73, in 11 families.

References 

Populated places in Boyer-Ahmad County